Denyse del Carmen Floreano Camargo (born August 26, 1976) is a Venezuelan model and beauty pageant titleholder who was Miss Venezuela 1994 and Top 6 finalist at Miss Universe 1995.

Miss Venezuela
Floreano competed in 1994 as Miss Costa Oriental in her country's national beauty pageant, Miss Venezuela, capturing the crown and the right to represent her country in Miss Universe 1995.

Miss Universe
As the official representative of her country to the 1995 Miss Universe pageant held in Windhoek, Namibia on May 12, 1995, she was one of the Top 6 finalists. Agencia Mariela Centeno Model Agency

References

External links
Miss Venezuela Official Website
Miss Universe Official Website

1976 births
Living people
Miss Universe 1995 contestants
Miss Venezuela winners
People from Ciudad Ojeda